Ioannis Grivas (23 February 1923 – 27 November 2016) was a Greek judge, who served as President of the Court of Cassation and served as the Prime Minister of Greece at the head of a non-party caretaker government in 1989.

Life 
Grivas was born in Kato Tithorea, Phthiotis. He studied law at the University of Athens and in 1954 he became a judge. He took part as a judge in the Greek Junta Trials in 1975, and in 1979, he was appointed to the Supreme Court of Greece for Civil and Criminal Cases. He became vice-president of the court in 1986 and president in 1989–90.

In 1989, when the Greek Parliament was deadlocked between the PASOK and New Democracy parties following the 18 June 1989 elections, the Constitution requiring that the president of one of Greece's Supreme Courts be appointed interim Prime Minister, Grivas agreed to head a caretaker government to preside over fresh elections.

He took office on 12 October 1989 to lead the country to new elections, held on 5 November. After the elections produced another deadlocked Parliament, he resigned on 23 November 1989 in favour of Xenophon Zolotas, who formed a coalition government in which all three parliamentary parties participated. Grivas retired in 1990. He died on 27 November 2016, aged 93.

References

1923 births
2016 deaths
20th-century prime ministers of Greece
20th-century Greek judges
National and Kapodistrian University of Athens alumni
People from Phthiotis
Presidents of the Supreme Civil and Criminal Court of Greece